K'isi Kancha (Quechua k'isi a stipa variety, kancha corral, "stipa corral", hispanicized spelling Quisicancha) is a mountain in the Cordillera Central in the Andes of Peru which reaches an altitude of approximately . It is located in the Lima Region, Yauyos Province, Miraflores District, east of Altarniyuq.

References

Mountains of Peru
Mountains of Lima Region